O 13 was an  of the Royal Netherlands Navy that saw service during World War II. She was built by the Koninklijke Maatschappij De Schelde of Vlissingen. She was one of many Dutch ships doing convoy duty during the Spanish Civil War. At the time of the German invasion of the Netherlands, O 13 was on patrol off the Dutch coast and was attacked by German planes on multiple occasions. After fleeing to England, the submarine was lost during a patrol on the North Sea.

Service history

Before World War II
O 13 ran into a fishing boat, HD 7, from Den Helder in the Schulpengat on 26 September 1933, sinking HD 7. With sister ship , O 13 attended the Brussels International Exposition in 1935. In 1937 O 13 did convoy duty in the Strait of Gibraltar during the Spanish Civil War, along with Hertog Hendrik,  and O 15.

During World War II
During the German attack on the Netherlands in 1940 O 13 patrolled along the Dutch coast and was attacked multiple times by German aircraft. On 10 May 1940, she sailed to England escorted by the minesweeper  and arrived in Portsmouth the next day. During the evacuation of Dunkirk and Bordeaux O 13 was on patrol in the English Channel. O 13 sailed on her first patrol from Dundee on 12 June 1940 and disappeared. The submarine was presumed lost on 22 June 1940.

Since there are no German records about O 13 having been sunk it is assumed that the submarine ran into a mine, a distinct possibility since O 13 was patrolling in an area known to have been mined, possibly the same minefield where the Polish submarine  was lost. One other possibility is that O 13 was rammed by the Polish submarine , which reported running into an unidentified submarine on 20 June at 0.25 am, but that submarine allegedly had a deck gun mounted forward of the conning tower and O-13 did not. Moreover, the newest analysis of the Wilk's damages shows the most probable possibility: that it collided with a German minefield protector buoy, rather than a submarine. Searching of the O13 wreck in the area of the Wilk's reported collision was fruitless.

Monument and memory
O 22 was located near Norway in 1993. O 13 is referred to as "still on patrol", as it is the last Dutch submarine still to be found, of the seven submarines the Royal Dutch Navy lost in World War II. In September 2012, the Royal Netherlands Navy announced they would renew the search with new, advanced equipment.

References

1930 ships
Ships built in Vlissingen
World War II submarines of the Netherlands
O 12-class submarines
Missing submarines of World War II
Lost submarines of the Netherlands
Maritime incidents in June 1940
World War II shipwrecks in the North Sea
Warships lost with all hands
Submarines built by Koninklijke Maatschappij De Schelde